Joe Roman is a conservation biologist, academic, and author of the books Whale and Listed: Dispatches from America's Endangered Species Act.  His conservation research includes studies of the historical population size of whales, the role of cetaceans in the nitrogen cycle, the relationship between biodiversity and disease, and the genetics of invasions. He is the founding editor of "Eat the Invaders", a website dedicated to controlling invasive species by eating them.

Roman is a research associate professor in the Rubenstein School of Environment and Natural Resources and a Fellow at the Gund Institute for Ecological Economics at the University of Vermont. He earned an AB with Honors in Visual and Environmental Studies from Harvard University in 1985 and an MA in wildlife ecology and conservation from the University of Florida.  Roman was awarded his PhD from Harvard's Department of Organismic and Evolutionary Biology in 2003; his dissertation was titled Tracking Anthropogenic Change in the North Atlantic Ocean with Genetic Tools.  During his PhD, he co-authored, with Stephen Palumbi, a paper for the journal Science that presented evidence that whale populations had been considerably larger prior to whaling than had previously been thought.  By 2009, he was working with the Gund Institute with a Science and Technology Policy Fellowship from the American Association for the Advancement of Science, and also beginning a collaboration with the United States Environmental Protection Agency looking at loss of biodiversity. He had a Fulbright Fellowship at the Universidade Federal de Santa Catarina in Brazil in 2012, and he was the 2014–15 Sarah and Daniel Hrdy Visiting Fellow in Conservation Biology at Harvard. Born in Queens, New York, Roman lives in Vermont.

Books
 Listed: Dispatches from America's Endangered Species Act (2011, Harvard University Press)
 Whale (2006, Reaktion Books)
His book Listed won the 2012 Rachel Carson Environment Book Award from the Society of Environmental Journalists.

Journal articles

Popular articles
 “Vulnerable Species in the Crosshairs,” with Ya-Wei Li, The New York Times, July 26, 2018.
 “Can the Plover Save New York?” Slate, August 23, 2013.
 “Sharks Help Maintain Health of the Oceans,” Wall Street Journal, September 20, 2005.
 "Where Bright Lights and Night Life Are Nature's Doing." The Sunday New York Times, March 6, 2005.
 "A Place Where All the Snowflakes Are Still Different." The New York Times, January 2, 2004.

References

External links
 
 Eat the Invaders
 ResearchGate
 Science Friday

Living people
Conservation biologists
Harvard University alumni
University of Florida alumni
University of Vermont faculty
American male writers
American scientists
Year of birth missing (living people)